This article is the Electoral history of Robert Borden, the eighth Prime Minister of Canada (1911-1920).

A Conservative, he became Prime Minister after winning the federal election of 1911, defeating Sir Wilfrid Laurier.  He won two general elections (1911, 1917) and lost two (1904, 1908).  From 1911 to 1917, he led a Conservative government and from 1917 to 1920 led a Unionist coalition, formed over the issue of military conscription.

Borden was elected to the House of Commons of Canada eight times (1896, 1900, 1905, 1908 (twice), 1911 (twice), and 1917).

Borden retired in 1920 and was succeeded by Arthur Meighen.

Summary 

Borden ranks eighth out of twenty-three prime ministers for time in office.  He became Prime Minister in 1911, after defeating Sir Wilfrid Laurier and the Liberals, and was in office for a total of 8 years and 274 days. He served two consecutive terms, the first leading a Conservative government (1911 to 1917), the second leading a Unionist coalition government (1917 to 1920).

Borden was the third of three prime ministers from Nova Scotia, the other two being Sir John Sparrow David Thompson and Sir Charles Tupper.

Borden lost the first two general elections he contested, in 1904 and 1908, defeated in both cases by Laurier and the Liberals.  He won the third general election, in 1911, while Laurier became the Leader of the Opposition.

Borden led Canada during World War I.  One of the major political issues during the war was the conscription crisis of 1917.  Borden formed a coalition with Liberals who supported his conscription policy and led the coalition as the Government (Unionist) Party.  Those Liberals who opposed the conscription policy remained with the leadership of Laurier, and fought the election as the Opposition (Laurier Liberals) party.

Borden stood for election to the House of Commons of Canada nine times (1896, 1900, 1904, 1905 (by-election), 1908 (twice), 1911 (twice), and 1917), although two of those were multiple elections in the same general election, as was permitted at that time.   He was elected eight times (twice by acclamation) and defeated once (1904).  At various times, Borden was elected for three different constituencies in two different provinces:  Halifax, Nova Scotia;  Carleton, Ontario;  and Kings, Nova Scotia. He served in the Commons for a total of 25 years, 1 month, and 25 days.

Borden retired in 1920, and was succeeded by Arthur Meighen.

Federal general elections, 1904 to 1917 
Borden led the Conservative Party in three general elections, winning one (1911) and losing twice (1904, 1908).  He also led the Unionist Party in his last general election (1917), which he won.

Federal election, 1904 

Borden led the Conservatives in the 1904 general election.  He had replaced Sir Charles Tupper as leader of the Conservatives and Leader of the Opposition in 1901.  His opponent in the general election was Prime Minister Sir Wilfrid Laurier, leader of the Liberal Party of Canada.  Laurier and the Liberals again won a majority government and Borden continued as Leader of the Opposition.

1 Prime Minister when election was called;  Prime Minister after the election.
2 Leader of the Opposition when election was called;  Leader of the Opposition after the election.
3 Independent Liberal candidates received only 309 votes nationally.
4 Election returns in 1904 did not require candidates to declare party affiliation.  Some candidates did not list a party affiliation.
5 Rounding error.

Federal election, 1908 

Borden again led the Conservatives in the 1908 general election.  His opponent was again Prime Minister Laurier, the leader of the Liberals.  Laurier again won a majority government and Borden continued as Leader of the Opposition.

1 Prime Minister when election was called;  Prime Minister after the election.
2 Leader of the Opposition when election was called;  Leader of the Opposition after the election.
3 Election returns in 1908 did not require candidates to declare party affiliation.  Some candidates did not list a party affiliation.
4 Rounding error.

Federal election, 1911

Borden again led the Conservatives in the 1911 general election, which was fought on the issue of reciprocity (lowered trade  barriers) with the United States. Naval policy was also an issue.  Borden and the Conservatives won a majority government, defeating Laurier and the Liberals.  Borden became Prime Minister and Laurier became Leader of the Official Opposition.

1 Leader of the Opposition when election was called;  Prime Minister after the election.
2 Prime Minister when election was called;  Leader of the Opposition after the election.
3 Election returns in 1911 did not require candidates to declare party affiliation.  Some candidates did not list a party affiliation.

Federal election, 1917 

The 1917 election was Borden's last election.  The election was fought entirely on the issue of conscription and Canada's role in World War I.  Borden led a coalition of Conservatives and Liberals who supported the Borden government's conscription policy.  Laurier was again his opponent, leading those Liberals who opposed the conscription policy.  The election and the conscription crisis badly divided the country between English-Canadians, who tended to support conscription, and French-Canadians, who opposed it.  Borden was re-elected and formed the Unionist (coalition) government.

1 Leader of the Opposition when election was called;  Prime Minister after the election.
2 Prime Minister when election was called;  Leader of the Opposition after the election.
3 Election returns in 1911 did not require candidates to declare party affiliation.  Some candidates did not list a party affiliation.
4 Rounding error.

Federal constituency elections, 1896 to 1917 

Borden stood for election to the House of Commons nine times, in two different provinces (Nova Scotia and Ontario), in three different ridings. He was elected eight times and defeated once.

1896 Federal election:  Halifax

1900 Federal election:  Halifax

1904 Federal election:  Halifax

1905 Federal by-election:  Carleton 
On Mr. Kidd's resignation, January 1, 1905, to provide a seat for Robert Laird Borden.

1908 Federal election:  Halifax 

In the 1908 general election, Borden stood in two constituencies as was permitted at that time: Halifax, Nova Scotia and Carleton, Ontario. He was elected in both ridings but chose to sit for Halifax, and resigned the Carleton seat.

1908 Federal election:  Carleton 
In the 1908 general election, Borden stood in two constituencies as was permitted at that time: Carleton, Ontario and Halifax, Nova Scotia. He was elected in both ridings but chose to sit for Halifax, and resigned the Carleton seat.

1911 Federal election:  Halifax

1911 Federal Ministerial By-Election:  Halifax
At this time, newly appointed Cabinet ministers had to stand for re-election.  It was customary for the other party not to field a candidate.

1917 Federal election:  Kings

See also 

 Electoral history of Wilfrid Laurier - Borden's predecessor as Prime Minister.
 Electoral history of Charles Tupper - Borden's predecessor as leader of the Conservative Party.
 Electoral history of Arthur Meighen - Borden's successor as leader of the Conservative Party and as Prime Minister.

References

External links 

 History of Federal Ridings since 1867

Borden, Laurier